The Aruba Amateur Radio Club (AARC) is a national non-profit organization for amateur radio enthusiasts in Aruba.  AARC operates a QSL bureau for those members who regularly communicate with amateur radio operators in other countries.  The organization operates amateur radio repeaters located at points of high elevation on Sero Yamanota that can be accessed from around the island, from Curaçao, and parts of Venezuela.  AARC represents the interests of Aruban amateur radio operators before Aruban and international telecommunications regulatory authorities.  AARC is the national member society representing Aruba in the International Amateur Radio Union.

References 

Aruba
Organisations based in Aruba
1957 establishments in the Netherlands Antilles
Organizations established in 1957
Radio in Aruba